Give Us Tomorrow is a 1978 British crime film directed by Donovan Winter and starring Sylvia Syms, Derren Nesbitt and James Kerry.

Plot
After a bank manager leaves for work one morning, a criminal and his accomplice take his wife and children hostage; whilst at the branch, their accomplices force him to open the safe.

Location Shots
The credits say the film used Orpington, Kent for the location. The real house used was in the Kingsway area of Petts Wood. Bircwoood Road is also seen. The former, real, high street bank which was used, on the corner of Moorfield Road, still stands. The footage also briefly passes the railway station. Glimpses of the Sevenoak's Road turn-off to Petts Wood are also seen.

Cast
 Sylvia Syms ... Wendy
 Derren Nesbitt ... Ron
 James Kerry ... Martin
 Derek Anders ... Police Inspector
 Mark Elwes ... Assistant Manager
 Donna Evans ... Nicola Hammond
 Gene Foad ... Bank Clerk
 Alan Guy ... The Boy
 Richard Shaw ... 1st Bank Robber
 Derek Ware ... 2nd Bank Robber
 Victor Brooks ... Superintendent Ogilvie
 Matthew Haslett ... Jamie Hammond
 Ken Barker ... Police Sergeant Wilson
 Chris Holroyd ... P.C. McLaren
 Carol Shaw ... girl driver
 Lolly Cockrell ... Reporter
 William Parker ... Reporter
 Gil Sutherland ... Reporter

References

External links

1978 films
1978 crime films
British crime films
1970s English-language films
1970s British films